Sulphur Springs (also Sulpher Springs) is an unincorporated community in Ashley County, Arkansas, United States. The community is located at the southern terminus of Arkansas Highway 169.

References

Unincorporated communities in Ashley County, Arkansas
Unincorporated communities in Arkansas